Migdalia is a female given name. Notable people with the name include:

Migdalia Cruz (born 1958), American writer of plays, musical theatre, and opera
Migdalia Padilla, Puerto Rican politician
Migdalia Pérez, Cuban baseball player

Feminine given names